Mohammad Abubakar Durrani (born in Quetta Balochistan Pakistan) is a Pakistani canoeist and documentary/ short film maker , cameraman, cave photographer and owner of the Abdali Productions.

Family Background
Mohammad Abubakar Durrani hails from the ethnic Pashtun Sadduzai tribe, section of the Popalzai sub clan of Durrani Abdali Pashtun tribe, Mohammad Umar Durrani is his younger brother. He is son of eminent Pakistani caving legend and environmental scientists / Conservationist Hayatullah Khan Durrani and grandson of the sadozai Pashtun tribal chief and politician Shahzada Rehmatullah Khan Durrani.

Early life
Durrani became involved in the sport of kayaking as a child and went with his father to Hanna Lake to his father's water sports academy (Hayat Durrani Water Sports Academy)(HDWSA).   He won his first Gold medal in Competition held in 2005 at HDWSA Hanna Lake Quetta in Category K,1 (U 10). His major Achievement was winning the under 16 and 18 Gold Medals in Pakistan's National Canoeing Championship held in 2007 at Rawal Lake Islamabad. He is the youngest Kayak paddler athlete to have won the "Player of the Year Award" and is the only Kayaking player to have won this outstanding award in Pakistan eight consecutive times since 2007. Muhammad Abubakar Durrani defended his title and won National canoeing Championship 2022.

International Participation
Mohammad Abubakar Durrani Participated in the 14th and 15th Asian Canoe Sprint Championships held in Tehran Iran 2011 and in the historical city of Samarqand Uzbekistan 2013. He participated as official of National Speleological and Caving Team of Pakistan in 5th European Speleo Caving Conference 2016 Yorkshire and 10th PAK-Britain Friendship Caving and Speleo Expedition 2016 under the auspicious of British Caving Association and Orpheus Caving Club Derby-shire Great Britain.

 He represented Pakistan in the ICF international Canoeing championship held in Aronzo Di Cadore Italy 30 June to 2 July 2017 and subsequently in July 2019 and performed excellent, on his returned from Italy the Governor Balochistan invited the Pakistan National Canoeing team including Abubakar Durrani at Governor House Quetta and appreciated his performance in the ICF Canoeing Championship in Italy.

References

External links 
 Hayat Durrani Water Sports Academy
 Pakistan Canoe and Kayak Federation

1995 births
Living people
Pashtun people
People from Quetta
Pakistani male canoeists